In vector calculus, a Beltrami vector field, named after Eugenio Beltrami, is a vector field in three dimensions that is parallel to its own curl.  That is, F is a Beltrami vector field provided that

If  is solenoidal - that is, if  such as for an incompressible fluid or a magnetic field, the identity   becomes  and  this leads to

and if we further assume that  is a constant, we arrive at the simple form

Beltrami vector fields with nonzero curl correspond to Euclidean contact forms in three dimensions.

The vector field

is a multiple of the standard contact structure −z i + j, and furnishes an example of a Beltrami vector field.

See also
Beltrami flow
Complex lamellar vector field
Conservative vector field

References

.

Vector calculus